Sylvia Bassot (18 December 1940 – 3 January 2014) was a member of the National Assembly of France from 1996 until 2012.  She represented the Orne department, and was a member of the Union for a Popular Movement.

References

1940 births
2014 deaths
Union for a Popular Movement politicians
Women members of the National Assembly (France)
Deputies of the 12th National Assembly of the French Fifth Republic
Deputies of the 13th National Assembly of the French Fifth Republic
21st-century French women politicians
Politicians from Normandy
Members of the Regional Council of Normandy